Alexander Aquayo Benede (born 20 September 1988) is a German footballer who plays as a left wing-back for TSV Landsberg.

Career 
Benede began his career in the youth team of TSV 1860 München, before moving to cross-town rivals FC Bayern in 2005. After two years in Bayern's youth team, he was promoted to the reserve team. He made 13 appearances before being released in 2009. He spent a year without a club before joining Aindling in July 2010. One year later, he signed for BC Aichach.

Benede is a versatile player, most at home on the left flank. In the earlier part of his career, he was a forward, but more recently he has been used in more defensive roles.

Personal life 
His adoptive father is leader of the SOS Project of the Munich Police Department.

References

External links 
 Alexander Benede - Spielerprofil - FuPa - das Fußballportal

1988 births
Footballers from Munich
Living people
German footballers
Germany youth international footballers
Association football defenders
FC Bayern Munich II players
BC Aichach players
Regionalliga players
3. Liga players
Bayernliga players